A.C. Bastia 1924 is an Italian football club based in Bastia Umbra, Umbria. The club played in Serie D from 1956 to 1958, 1988 to 1995 and from 2012 to 2015; currently, the club is back in Serie D after winning promotion in 2018.

History
The club was founded in 1924, the first line up was: Bartolucci Antonio; Mencarelli Brasillo, Cingolani Igino; Caldari Fioravanti, Alunni Annibale e Pascolini Alfredo; Petrini Arcangelo, Farello Giovanni, Bucefari Vincenzo, Celori Pronto, Giannotti Gino.

In the early years the team didn't play in an official championship because of lack of money and played only friendlies. In 1935–36 the club played in the campionato unico per dilettanti.

The club played in this championship until 1945. In 1945 Bastia played in Prima Divisione. In 1947–48 the team was promoted to Serie C but the team was forced to renounce to it because of economical problems. In 1948–49 the club played in Prima Divisione, in 1949–50 in seconda divisione. In 1952–53 the club played in Prima Divisione because prima divisione was merged with seconda divisione.

In 1953–54 Bastia played in promozione regionale. After two years in Promozione the team was promoted in 1955–56 to IV Serie (Serie D) after winning the promotion playoff against Gubbio. In the first year in IV Serie the club managed to avoid relegation but at the end of the 1957–58 season the club was relegated to Promozione after losing relegation playoffs against Rotulea and Perugia.

Three seasons later Bastia won the Promozione Umbria championship but renounced to the promotion to Serie D. In the 1962–63 the team arrived 2nd in Promozione and won the Coppa Umbria. The club remained in Promozione until the 1971–72 season. In that season the team was relegated. At the end of the season the club ceased to exist. 

A new team, U.S. Bastia, joined the Terza Categoria championship. The new team, after a series of promotions, at the end of the season 1987–88 was promoted to Serie D. The club remained in this championship until 1995, missing promotion in 1989–90 (3rd place). At the end of the 1994–95 season, the club was relegated to Eccellenza Umbria.

In the season 2011–12 the team gained promotion from Eccellenza Umbria after finishing first, to Serie D, but were relegated in 2015. In 2018 they won promotion once again.

Colors and badge
Its colours are white and red.

Chronology
1955–56: 1st in Promozione after promotion playoff against Gubbio. Promoted in IV Serie
1956–57: 15th in IV Serie
1957–58: 12th in IV Serie. Relegated
1959–60: 3rd in Promozione
1960–61: 1st in Promozione
1961–62: 5th in Promozione
1962–63: 2nd in Promozione. The club won Coppa Umbria
1964–65: 5th in Promozione
1966–67: 9th in Promozione
1967–68: 13th in Promozione
1970–71: 15th in Promozione
1971–72: 15th in Promozione. Relegated
1988–89: 11th in Campionato Interregionale
1989–90: 3rd in Campionato Interregionale
1990–91: 5th in Campionato Interregionale
1991–92: 8th in Campionato Interregionale
1992–93: 14th in C.N.D.
1993–94: 14th in C.N.D.
1994–95: 18th in C.N.D. Relegated to Eccellenza
2006–07: 5th in Eccellenza
2007–08: 10th in Eccellenza
2008–09: 4th in Eccellenza Lost promotion play-offs
2009–10: 5th in Eccellenza Lost promotion play-offs
2010–11: 6th in Eccellenza
2011–12: 1st in Eccellenza Promoted to Serie D
2012–13: 11th in Serie D
2013-14: 14th in Group E in Serie D. Won relegation play-offs
2014-15: 18th in Group E in Serie D. Relegated to Eccellenza, reached preliminary rounds of Coppa Italia
2015-16: 13th in Eccellenza Umbria.
2016-17: 7th in Eccellenza Umbria.
2017-18: 1st in Eccellenza Umbria. Promoted to Serie D

References

External links
 Official website

Bastia 1924
Association football clubs established in 1924
Football clubs in Umbria
1924 establishments in Italy
Association football clubs established in 1972
1972 establishments in Italy